The Autocarrier was the first commercial 3-wheeler produced by AC Cars and it was the car that gave the company their name.

History
The Autocarrier was designed and manufactured by John Weller in 1908. It began its life as a three-wheeled delivery van, and it was not uncommon for a company to have a least one Autocarrier to be their delivery van.

Models
Later in 1908 AC started to change the layout of the Autocarrier and came up with some different models.

The Sociable
The AC Sociable was an adapted version of the Autocarrier. This new version was adapted to have a passenger seat in the front and that is where the car's name came from. The Sociable was also used by the British Army because of their reliability and special bodywork was fitted so a machine gun could be fitted.

The Petite
The Petite wasn't manufactured until 1953 due to World War I and World War II. The Petite was powered by a 346cc 2-stroke Villers engine. The Petite was the most different from the other 3-wheeled cars made by AC because it had a roof whereas all of the other 3-wheeled cars didn't have a roof.

References

See also
AC Cars
Three-wheeled car

Autocarrier
Cars introduced in 1908